Senegal competed at the 1996 Summer Olympics in Atlanta, United States.

Results by event

Athletics

Men 

Track and road events

Field events

Judo 

Men

Wrestling 

Freestyle

References 
 Senegalese Olympic Committee
 Official Olympic Reports

Nations at the 1996 Summer Olympics
1996 Summer Olympics
Olympics